H. Moser & Cie. is a trademark of Moser Schaffhausen AG, a Swiss luxury watch manufacturer. The original H. Moser & Cie. was founded by independent watchmaker Heinrich Moser in St. Petersburg, Russia in 1828. Notable early clients of H. Moser & Cie. included Russian princes and members of the Russian Imperial Court; Vladimir Lenin also owned a Moser watch. After Moser died in 1874, the company was sold, and its business in Russia was expropriated in 1918 due to the October Revolution. 

In 1953, H. Moser & Cie. continued its business in Le Locle, Switzerland where it shifted its focus from pocket watches to wristwatches. Due to the quartz crisis, H. Moser & Cie. became a part of the Dixi Mechanique Group and the original brand name was dropped. In 2002, Moser Schaffhausen AG was founded by Dr. Jürgen Lange together with Heinrich Moser's great-grandson Roger Nicholas Balsiger, and the brand H. Moser & Cie. was formally re-launched in 2005. Since 2012, Moser Schaffhausen AG has been a subsidiary of the MELB Holding Group of the Meylan family in Switzerland.

History

Early history 
Heinrich Moser was born in Schaffhausen, Switzerland on December 12, 1805. He learned the basic watchmaking craftsmanship from his father, and continued his studies in Le Locle, Switzerland after 1824. In 1828, he founded the original H. Moser & Cie. in St. Petersburg, Russia. 

In 1848, Heinrich Moser returned to his hometown of Schaffhausen and established a watch factory there to supply his business. Notable clients of H. Moser & Cie. at the time included Russian princes and members of the Russian Imperial Court. In particular, Vladimir Lenin also owned a Moser watch. Heinrich Moser died on October 23, 1874, and the company was sold since none of his heirs was willing to lead the business. 

In 1953, H. Moser & Cie. continued its business in Le Locle where it produced its first wristwatches. But due to the quartz crisis, H. Moser & Cie. became a part of the Dixi Mechanique Group and the original brand name was dropped, becoming "Hy Moser & Cie".

Recent development 
In 2002, Moser Schaffhausen AG was founded by Dr. Jürgen Lange, together with Heinrich Moser's great-grandson Roger Nicholas Balsiger. In 2005, the company established a new Manufacture in Schaffhausen, Switzerland, and H. Moser & Cie. was formally re-launched as a trademark of the company. 

Since 2012, H. Moser & Cie. has been owned by the MELB Holding Group of the Meylan family in Switzerland. As of 2022, H. Moser & Cie. produces over 2,000 watches a year and employs close to 100 staff members.

Watch manufacturing 

H. Moser & Cie. manufactures its own watch components. It launched the first three watches in 2005 after the brand was revived. 

In 2006, the Perpetual Calendar from H. Moser & Cie. won the Geneva Watchmaking Grand Prix.

At Baselworld 2007, H. Moser & Cie. introduced the Straumann Hairspring. The hairspring was developed jointly with H. Moser & Cie.'s associate company Precision Engineering AG in Schaffhausen. It contains a formula updated from Nivarox, an alloy composition originally invented by Dr. h.c. Reinhard Straumann in 1931.

In 2009, H. Moser & Cie. introduced their tonneau-shaped watch, the Henry. It featured a "Straumann Double Hairspring," which had two hairsprings that counter rotates as opposed to only one hairspring. The Henry was later discontinued in favor of the Swiss Alps line.

SIHH special watch 
Since 2016, H. Moser & Cie. has unveiled a special watch every year at the annual Salon International de la Haute Horlogerie (SIHH) to raise public awareness on different topics. 

 2016, the Swiss Alps Watch Zzzz, a parody of Apple Watch
 2017, the Swiss Mad Watch, with the case made of real Swiss cheese
 2018, the Swiss Icons Watch, mixing notable features from various Swiss watch manufacturers
 2019, the Moser Nature Watch, covered with live Swiss plants

See also 

 List of watch manufacturers
Manufacture d'horlogerie

References 

Swiss watch brands
Watch manufacturing companies of Switzerland
Luxury brands